Prosanta Chakrabarty (born November 25, 1978) is an American ichthyologist and professor of ichthyology, evolution and systematics at Louisiana State University. He studied at McGill University where he received a bachelor of science in Applied Zoology and at the University of Michigan where he obtained his PhD in Ecology and Evolution. Among other professional positions he was a Program Director for the National Science Foundation and is currently the President-Elect of the American Society of Ichthyologist and Herpetologist. He was named a TED Fellow in 2016, and a TED Senior Fellow in 2018. He was named an Elected Fellow of the AAAS for "distinguished contributions to evolutionary biology, focusing on the bioluminescent systems and historical biogeography of freshwater fishes, and for effectively communicating science to the public."

Research 
Chakrabarty's research has taken him to over 30 countries  and has described over 13 new species of fishes. In 2014 he discovered Hoosier cavefish with colleagues Jacques Prejean and Matthew Niemiller. As curator of fishes at LSU he has added 100k specimens to the collection. Using phylogenetic systematics, geometric morphometrics among others tools, Prosanta Chakrabarty attempts to understand  the evolution of biological diversity, molecular evolution, and conservation of marine and freshwater fishes. His research interests are understanding the diversity and evolution of fish.

New species described 

1) Paretroplus tsimoly

2) Mystus falcarius  3) Nandus prolixus

4) Photoplagios laterofenestra

5) Nuchequula mannusella

6)  Equulites absconditus

7) Milyeringa brooksi

8) Halieutichthys intermedius

9) Halieutichthys bispinosus

10) Profundulus kreiseri

11) Typhleotris mararybe

12) Roeboides bussingi

13) Amblyopsis hoosieri

14) Caecieleotris morrisi

'''15) Photolateralis polyfenestrus

 Awards and honors 
2020 Named Fulbright Distinguished Chair in Ottawa Canada

2019 Elected Fellow of the American Association for the Advancement of Science 

2018 Forty Under 40, Greater Baton Rouge Business Report

2018 Named a Senior Fellow at TED

2016 Named to the 2016 Class of TED Fellows

2015 Elected Secretary of the American Society of Ichthyologists and Herpetologists

2011Top Ten New Species Award, The International Institute for Species Exploration and the International Top 10 Selections Committee; with co-authors Hsuan-Ching Ho and John Sparks for the description of Halieutichthys intermedius Selected publications 

Books
 
 

 Journal articles 

 
 Alda, F., Adams, A.J., McMillan, W.O., Chakrabarty, P. (2017) Complete mitochondrial genomes of three Neotropical sleeper gobies: Eleotris amblyopsis, Eleotris picta and Hemieleotris latifasciata (Gobiiformes: Eleotridae)Mitochondrial DNA Part B: Resources 2: 747-750.
 Butler, J.M., Whitlow, S.M., Gwan, A.P., Chakrabarty, P., Maruska, K.P. 2017. Swim bladder morphology changes with female reproductive state in the mouth brooding African cichlid Astatotilapia burtoni. Journal of Experimental Biology220: 4463-4470
 Alda, F., Adams, A.J., McMillan, W.O., Chakrabarty, P. 2018. Mitogenomic divergence between three pairs of putative geminate fishes from Panama. Mitochondrial DNA Part B 3: 1-5.
 Burress, E.D., Alda, F. Duarte, A., Loureiro, M., Armbruster, J.W., Chakrabarty, P. 2018. Phylogenomics of the pike cichlids (Cichlidae: Crenicichla) and the rapid evolution and trophic diversification in an incipient species flock. Journal of Evolutionary Biology 31: 14-30 [Cover Article]
 Elias , D.J., Mochel, S.F., Chakrabarty, P., McMahan, C., (2018) First record of the non-native Pacu, Piaractus brachypomus in Lago Peten-Itza, Guatemala, Central America. Occasional Papers of the Museum of Natural Science'' 88, 1-6.

References

External links 

 
 Academic website

1978 births
American ichthyologists
American systems scientists
Living people
Louisiana State University faculty
McGill University Faculty of Science alumni
University of Michigan School of Natural Resources and Environment alumni